Jack Watson (15 May 1915 – 4 July 1999) was an English actor who appeared in many British films and television dramas from the 1950s onwards.

Early life
Watson was born in Thorney, Cambridgeshire. He was the son of a Gaiety Girl, Barbara Hughes, and a music hall comedian, Nosmo King. Watson often appeared on stage with his father as straight man, where he was known simply as Hubert.

Military service
During the Second World War he was a physical training instructor in the Royal Navy, and his physique was much in evidence in many of his subsequent screen roles.

Career
During the war Watson was resident compère of the BBC radio comedy The Navy Mixture. After the war, his talent as an impersonator resulted in his becoming a regular on BBC radio programmes such as Take it from Here, Hancock's Half Hour and The Clitheroe Kid. He gradually made the transition to television, where his first major role was in Coronation Street, in which he became Elsie Tanner's (Pat Phoenix) first lover. Watson appeared in Coronation Street as Bill Gregory on and off between 1961 and 1984 ; his final episode in 1984 was also the final episode for Pat Phoenix who played his love interest Elsie Tanner in the series. He was one of the villains in the 1966 episode of The Avengers entitled "Silent Dust", chasing Diana Rigg on horseback with a whip. He appeared as a powerful but shell-shocked ex-soldier in Dr. Finlay's Casebook, in an episode entitled "Not qualified" which formed part of the 8th series of the popular British programme.  Probably his best-known television role was as Llud, Arthur's craggy sidekick in Arthur of the Britons. His last major TV role was in the award-winning Edge of Darkness (1985).

Watson appeared in over 70 films, including Peeping Tom, This Sporting Life, Grand Prix, Tobruk, The McKenzie Break, The Devil's Brigade and The Wild Geese.

Filmography

 Captain Horatio Hornblower (1951) – Capt. Sylvester (uncredited)
 Peeping Tom (1960) – Chief Insp. Gregg
 Konga (1961) – Supt. Brown
 Fate Takes a Hand (1961) – Bulldog
 The Queen's Guards (1961) – Sergeant Johnson
 Time to Remember (1962) – Insp. Bolam
 Out of the Fog (1962) – Sgt. Harry Tracey
 On the Beat (1962) – Police Sergeant
 Master Spy (1963) – Capt. Foster
 Five to One (1963) – Insp. Davis
 This Sporting Life (1963) – Len Miller
 The Gorgon (1964) – Ratoff
 The Hill (1965) – Jock McGrath
 Night Caller from Outer Space (1965) – Sgt. Hawkins
 The Idol (1966) – Police Inspector
 Grand Prix (1966) – Jeff Jordan
 Tobruk (1967) – Sgt. Maj. Tyne
 The Devil's Brigade (1968) – Cpl. Peacock
 The Strange Affair (1968) – Quince
 Decline and Fall... of a Birdwatcher (1968) – Gallery Warder
 Every Home Should Have One (1970) – McLaughlin
 The McKenzie Break (1970) – Gen. Kerr
 Kidnapped (1971) – James Stewart
 Tower of Evil (1972) – Hamp
 From Beyond the Grave (1974) – Sir Michael Sinclair (segment 4 "The Door")
 11 Harrowhouse (1974) – Miller, 11 Harrowhouse Security
 Juggernaut (1974) – Chief Engineer Mallicent
 The Four Musketeers (1974) – Busigny
 Schizo (1976) – William Haskin
 The Purple Taxi (1977) – Sean
 The Wild Geese (1978) – R.S.M. Sandy Young
 North Sea Hijack (1980) – Olafsen
 The Sea Wolves (1980) – Maclean
 Masada (1981) – Decurion
 Marco Polo (1982) – Old Sailor
 Diana (1984) – Uncle Mark
 Tangiers (1982) – Donovan
 Christopher Columbus (1985) – Father Marchena

Personal life
Watson married Betty Garland, a BBC engineer, in 1943 and remained married until his death in 1999. They had two daughters and a son. He lived in Bath, England.

Death
He died on 4 July 1999, aged 84, of blood cancer.

References

External links

1915 births
1999 deaths
English male film actors
English male television actors
People from Fenland District
Royal Navy personnel of World War II
Male actors from Cambridgeshire
20th-century English male actors
Royal Navy sailors
Deaths from blood cancer
Deaths from cancer in England